General Dodds may refer to:

Alfred-Amédée Dodds (1842–1922), French general of division
Thomas Dodds (1873–1943), Australian Army major general
W. O. H. Dodds (1867–1934), Canadian Expeditionary Force brigadier general

See also
General Dodd (disambiguation)
General Dodge (disambiguation)